The men's 2000 metre tandem was one of seven track cycling events on the Cycling at the 1908 Summer Olympics programme. Each nation could enter up to 6 teams of 2.

Competition format

The tandem race was a sprint-style race with teams of 2 on tandem bicycles. The distance was 2000 metres, or approximately 3.3 laps of the 660-yard track. The time limit for the race was 4 minutes. The competition was held over three rounds (heats, semifinals, and a final). The first round consisted of 7 heats of 2 or 3 teams each, with the winning team in each heat as well as the fastest second-place team advancing to the semifinals. There were 2 semifinals of 4 teams each; the winning team in each semifinal as well as the faster second-place team advanced to the final. The final featured 3 teams, so all finalists received medals.

Results

First round

The fastest team in each of the seven heats and the fastest second-place team overall advanced to the semifinals.

The competition was held on Monday, July 13, 1908 starting at 4.15 p.m. (first four heats) and at 5.15 p.m. (remaining three heats).

Heat 1

Heat 2

Heat 3

Heat 4

Heat 5

Heat 6

Heat 7

Semifinals

The fastest team in each heat as well as the fastest second-place team overall advanced to the final.

The competition was held on Wednesday, July 15, 1908 starting at 5 p.m.

Semifinal 1

Semifinal 2

Final

The final was held on Wednesday, July 15, 1908 at 5.45 p.m.

Notes

Sources
 
 De Wael, Herman. Herman's Full Olympians: "Cycling 1908". Accessed 7 April 2006.

Men's tandem
Track cycling at the 1908 Summer Olympics
Cycling at the Summer Olympics – Men's tandem